Kent Land District may refer to:
 Kent Land District, Tasmania
 Kent Land District, Western Australia

District name disambiguation pages